Tseng Wen-ting (born July 6, 1984 in Tamsui, Taiwan) is a Taiwanese basketball player. He currently plays for the New Taipei CTBC DEA of the T1 League.

As one of the rare mobile players taller than 2 metres in Taiwan, Tseng has also served as starting centre for the Chinese Taipei national basketball team since his national team debut at the FIBA Asia Championship 2001.  At the FIBA Asia Championship 2009, Tseng helped Chinese Taipei to a fifth-place finish while averaging 10.4 points and 4.7 rebounds per game.  The fifth-place finish was Chinese Taipei's best finish in the tournament since the turn of the century.

On September 30, 2022, Tseng has signed with New Taipei CTBC DEA of the T1 League for three years.

References

1984 births
Living people
Centers (basketball)
Osaka Evessa players
Sportspeople from New Taipei
Power forwards (basketball)
Shanghai Sharks players
Taiwanese men's basketball players
Basketball players at the 2002 Asian Games
Basketball players at the 2006 Asian Games
Basketball players at the 2014 Asian Games
Taiwanese expatriate basketball people in China
Taiwanese basketball people in Japan
Taiwanese expatriate basketball people
Asian Games competitors for Chinese Taipei
Taipei Fubon Braves players
New Taipei CTBC DEA players
T1 League players
Chinese Taipei men's national basketball team players
Yulon Luxgen Dinos players
Sichuan Blue Whales players
Super Basketball League players
ASEAN Basketball League players
P. League+ players
T1 League All-Stars